Imesh Udayanga (born 14 January 1990) is a Sri Lankan first-class cricketer who plays for Badureliya Sports Club.

References

External links
 

1990 births
Living people
Sri Lankan cricketers
Badureliya Sports Club cricketers
South Asian Games silver medalists for Sri Lanka
South Asian Games medalists in cricket